"Weela Weela Walya", also called "Weila Waile", "Wella Wallia" or "The River Saile", is an Irish schoolyard song that tells the story of an infanticide in a light-hearted way. It was popularised in the 1960s by Irish folk bands The Dubliners and The Clancy Brothers.

Origin
The song is a variation of a murder ballad called "The Cruel Mother" or "The Greenwood Side" (Child 20, Roud 9), but in an up-tempo version sung by children in the schoolyard. As in several versions of "The Cruel Mother", the woman stabs the baby in the heart using "a penknife long and sharp," but whereas in "The Cruel Mother" the woman is visited by the ghosts of the children she killed, in "Weela Weela Walya" it is "two policeman and a man" (two uniformed police and a detective, or possibly a psychiatrist), who come to her door and arrest her for the murder. Neither this version nor any adult Irish version is found in Child's English and Scottish Popular Ballads, but it is listed in the Roud Folk Song Index. The song was popular with Irish Traveller children. A similar song, "Old Mother Lee", is sung in playgrounds in Liverpool.

The refrain "Weile Weile Waile" is a version of the Middle English expression of grief "wellaway!" (Old English wā lā wā, "woe, la!, woe).

Performance
The song was recorded by The Clancy Brothers as "Wella Wallia" on Recorded Live in Ireland (1965), and as "Weila Waile" by The Dubliners on their 1967 album A Drop of the Hard Stuff. It was a popular part of the Dubliners' repertoire for decades, appearing on several of their live albums, and was sung at the funeral of Ronnie Drew in 2008.
Virgin Prunes's singers Guggi and Gavin Friday sung a version of the song in the 1981 video Sons Find Devils.

Lyrics
There was an old woman and she lived in the woods
Weela Weela Walya
There was an old woman and she lived in the woods
Down by the river Saile.

She had a baby three months old
Weela Weela Walya
She had a baby three months old
Down by the river Saile.

She had a penknife long and sharp
Weela Weela Walya
She had a penknife long and sharp
Down by the river Saile.

She stuck the penknife in the baby's heart
Weela Weela Walya
She stuck the penknife in the baby's heart
Down by the river Saile.

Three loud knocks came a'knocking on the door
Weela Weela Walya
Three loud knocks came a'knocking on the door
Down by the river Saile.

Two policemen and a man
Weela Weela Walya
Two policemen and a man
Down by the river Saile.

"Are you the woman that killed the child?"
Weela Weela Walya
"Are you the woman that killed the child?"
Down by the river Saile.

"I am the woman that killed the child"
Weela Weela Walya
"I am the woman that killed the child"
Down by the river Saile.

They took her away and they put her in jail
Weela Weela Walya
They took her away and they put her in jail
Down by the river Saile.

Alternate Ending:
They took her up and strung her by the neck
Weela Weela Walya
They took her up and strung her by the neck
Down by the river Saile.

And that was the end of the woman in the woods
Weela Weela Walya
And that was the end of the woman in the woods
Down by the river Saile.

In culture
The song's morbid theme of infanticide, juxtaposed with its childish nature, has made it popular as a cultural reference. It is mentioned in Sebastian Barry's novel Annie Dunne, Hannah Kent's novel The Good People, and Daniel Shortell's novel th!s, and forms a substantial inspiration for the film The Hole in the Ground, which also features Lisa Hannigan's version of the song.

Notes

References

Murder ballads
Irish folk songs
Songs about child abuse
Irish children's songs
Traditional children's songs
Year of song unknown
The Dubliners songs
Infanticide